Ulysse Trélat (13 November 1798 – 29 January 1879) was a French doctor and politician. He was briefly Minister of Public Works in 1848.

Life
Ulysse Trélat was born on 13 November 1798 in Montargis, Loiret, the son of a notary.
Trélat became a military surgeon in 1813.
He interned at Charenton, and became a doctor in medicine in 1821.
Trélat was a doctor at the Pitié-Salpêtrière Hospital in 1838.

Trélat was a founding member of the lodge Aide de toi, le ciel t'aidera.
He was editor of the Patriote du Puy-de-Dôme.
He became colonel in the National Guard, representative for Puy-de-Dôme in 1848 and vice-president of the Constituent Assembly.
Trélat was Minister of Public Works from May to June 1848.
He was a municipal counselor for Paris (district of the Panthéon) from 1871 to 1874.
He died on 29 January 1879 in Menton, Alpe-Maritimes.

Family

Trélat married Marie Jeanne Louise Potin (d. 1838) on 30 December 1826.
Their first child was Émile Trélat, born in Paris on 6 March 1821 and later legitimized, who went on to become a Deputy for the Seine from 1891 to 1898. 
They also had a daughter and two other sons, Alphonse and Ulysse (1828-1890). 
The latter became a distinguished surgeon and professor.

References
Notes

Citations

Sources

1798 births
1879 deaths
People from Montargis
Politicians from Centre-Val de Loire
Moderate Republicans (France)
French Ministers of Public Works
Members of the 1848 Constituent Assembly
19th-century French physicians
Burials at Père Lachaise Cemetery